The 2021 Madrilenian regional election was held on Tuesday, 4 May 2021, to elect the 12th Assembly of the Community of Madrid. All 136 seats in the Assembly were up for election. This marked the first time that a regional premier in Madrid made use of the presidential prerogative to call an early election.

On 10 March 2021 after the unexpected announcement by the Spanish Socialist Workers' Party (PSOE) and Citizens (Cs) of moves to bring down People's Party-led governments in the Region of Murcia, Madrilenian president Isabel Díaz Ayuso broke her alliance with Cs and called a snap election in the Community of Madrid for 4 May, a move which she had unsuccessfully attempted twice in 2020. Despite both the PSOE and Más Madrid preventively filing motions of no confidence in an attempt to thwart Ayuso's move, the next day the Assembly's bureau provisionally acknowledged the parliamentary dissolution, though it announced a complaint against Ayuso's election call. Subsequently, the second deputy prime minister of Spain and Unidas Podemos national leader, Pablo Iglesias, announced he would be stepping down from his national cabinet posts in order to run as his alliance's leading candidate in the regional election.

The election resulted in a landslide victory for Ayuso's PP, which fell four seats short of an overall majority and secured more votes and seats than all three main leftist parties combined, in what was the best performance since 2011. The vote share of both the PSOE and Cs collapsed, with the former being surpassed by Más Madrid and the latter failing to win any seats. In the election aftermath, Iglesias announced his farewell from Spanish politics and his resignation from all of his political and institutional posts. The strong result for the PP, fueled by Ayuso's controversial personality and charisma as well as a general feeling of exhaustion in the region in response to restrictions enforced to curb the COVID-19 pandemic by the Spanish government of Pedro Sánchez, meant that it was not dependent on the far-right Vox's explicit support to form a government, though it still required its confidence-and-supply to pass laws.

Overview

Electoral system
The Assembly of Madrid was the devolved, unicameral legislature of the autonomous community of Madrid, having legislative power in regional matters as defined by the Spanish Constitution and the Madrilenian Statute of Autonomy, as well as the ability to vote confidence in or withdraw it from a regional president.

Voting for the Assembly was on the basis of universal suffrage, which comprised all nationals over 18 years of age, registered in the Community of Madrid and in full enjoyment of their political rights. Additionally, Madrilenians abroad were required to apply for voting before being permitted to vote, a system known as "begged" or expat vote. All members of the Assembly of Madrid were elected using the D'Hondt method and a closed list proportional representation, with a threshold of five percent of valid votes—which included blank ballots—being applied regionally. Parties not reaching the threshold were not taken into consideration for seat distribution. The Assembly was entitled to one member per each 50,000 inhabitants or fraction greater than 25,000.

Election date
The term of the Assembly of Madrid expired four years after the date of its previous election, with elections to the Assembly being fixed for the fourth Sunday of May every four years. The previous election was held on 26 May 2019, setting the date for the next ordinary election of the Assembly on Sunday, 28 May 2023.

The president had the prerogative to dissolve the Assembly of Madrid and call a snap election, provided that no motion of no confidence was in process, no nationwide election was due and some time requirements were met: namely, that dissolution did not occur either during the first legislative session or within the legislature's last year ahead of its scheduled expiry, nor before one year had elapsed since a previous dissolution. In the event of an investiture process failing to elect a regional president within a two-month period from the first ballot, the Assembly was to be automatically dissolved and a fresh election called. Any snap election held as a result of these circumstances would not alter the period to the next ordinary election, with elected deputies merely serving out what remained of their four-year terms.

Throughout 2020, as a result of both the growing divisions between the two governing coalition partners and the perceived likelihood of a motion of no confidence being tabled by the opposition over Díaz Ayuso's perceived mismanagement of the COVID-19 pandemic in the Community of Madrid, Ayuso considered calling a snap election in the region. A first attempt was reportedly aborted by her party's national leadership in June 2020, but in September, it was reported that Ayuso intended a regional election in Madrid be held concurrently with the announced Catalan regional election by Catalan president Quim Torra, tentatively scheduled for some point in late 2020 or early 2021. Ayuso herself seemed to cast off such rumours through her Twitter account.

On 10 March 2021, both the Spanish Socialist Workers' Party (PSOE) and Citizens (Cs) announced an agreement under which they would jointly bring down the People's Party (PP) governments in the city and the region of Murcia, where both PP and Cs had been in government ever since the 2019 local and regional elections. This prompted President Ayuso to immediately end her alliance with Cs and call a snap regional election for 4 May 2021, wary of the Cs branch in Madrid being intent on bringing her down in a similar fashion. The PSOE and Más Madrid tried to prevent the election call by filling one no-confidence motion each. Because the election decree does not enter into force until the moment of its publication, the situation raised the issue on which decision should be legally considered to have occurred first, since an election cannot be called while the process of a motion of no confidence is underway. Upon the publication of the dissolution decree the next day, the Assembly's bureau provisionally acknowledged the election call but announced it would study filling a complaint against it.

Parliamentary composition
The Assembly of Madrid was officially dissolved on 11 March 2021, after the publication of the dissolution decree in the Official Gazette of the Community of Madrid. The table below shows the composition of the parliamentary groups in the Assembly at the time of dissolution.

Parties and candidates
The electoral law allowed for parties and federations registered in the interior ministry, coalitions and groupings of electors to present lists of candidates. Parties and federations intending to form a coalition ahead of an election were required to inform the relevant Electoral Commission within ten days of the election call, whereas groupings of electors needed to secure the signature of at least 0.5 percent of the electorate in the Community of Madrid, disallowing electors from signing for more than one list of candidates.

Below is a list of the main parties and electoral alliances which contested the election:

Timetable
The key dates are listed below (all times are CET):

10 March: The election decree is issued with the countersign of the President.
11 March: Formal dissolution of the Assembly of Madrid and beginning of a suspension period of events for the inauguration of public works, services or projects.
14 March: Initial constitution of provincial and zone electoral commissions.
21 March: Deadline for parties and federations intending to enter into a coalition to inform the relevant electoral commission.
31 March: Deadline for parties, federations, coalitions, and groupings of electors to present lists of candidates to the relevant electoral commission.
2 April: Submitted lists of candidates are provisionally published in the Official Gazette of the Community of Madrid (BOCM).
5 April: Deadline for citizens entered in the Register of Absent Electors Residing Abroad (CERA) and for citizens temporarily absent from Spain to apply for voting.
6 April: Deadline for parties, federations, coalitions, and groupings of electors to rectify irregularities in their lists.
7 April: Official proclamation of valid submitted lists of candidates.
8 April: Proclaimed lists are published in the BOCM.
18 April: Official start of electoral campaigning.
22 April: Deadline to apply for postal voting .
27 April: Official start of legal ban on electoral opinion polling publication, dissemination or reproduction and deadline for CERA citizens to vote by mail.
30 April: Deadline for postal and temporarily absent voters to issue their votes .
2 May: Last day of official electoral campaigning and deadline for CERA citizens to vote in a ballot box in the relevant consular office or division.
3 May: Official 24-hour ban on political campaigning prior to the general election (reflection day).
4 May: Polling day (polling stations open at 9 am and close at 8 pm or once voters present in a queue at/outside the polling station at 8 pm have cast their vote). Provisional counting of votes starts immediately.
7 May: General counting of votes, including the counting of CERA votes.
10 May: Deadline for the general counting of votes to be carried out by the relevant electoral commission.
19 May: Deadline for elected members to be proclaimed by the relevant electoral commission.
28 June: Final deadline for definitive results to be published in the BOCM.

Campaign

Party slogans

Pre-campaign period
Right after the announcement of fresh elections, President Díaz Ayuso launched the "Socialism or freedom" and "Communism or freedom" slogans, as a derogatory reference to the policies that left-of-centre parties would apply should they reach the government. Second deputy prime minister of the Spanish government Pablo Iglesias announced that he would be contesting the regional election as lead candidate for his coalition, Unidas Podemos. After an attempt to contest the election in an electoral alliance with Más Madrid, the latter's candidate Mónica García rejected it.

In March 2021, Toni Cantó, former leader of Citizens in the Valencian Community, announced that he would join Díaz Ayuso's candidacy, which was accepted by the Electoral Commission. However, on 11 April the courts banned Cantó from the list for not complying with the needed requirements of being registered in the Community of Madrid ahead of the election call.

Election debates

Opinion polls

On 23 April, and following a death threat of unknown origin in the form of a menacing mail with four rifle bullets issued to Pablo Iglesias, Interior ministry Fernando Grande-Marlaska and Civil Guard director general María Gámez, a clash ensued between Iglesias and far-right Vox candidate Rocío Monasterio in the Cadena SER debate over the latter's refusal to explicitly condemn the incident. Monasterio accused Iglesias of hypocrisy for refusing to condemn the assaults that Vox members had suffered on the campaign trail, while adding that "Spaniards just don't believe anything [the Spanish government] says" and casting doubts on the veracity of the threat. This prompted Iglesias to walk out of the debate as he argued it risked "whitewashing fascism" and normalizing their arguments, which was followed by PSOE and Más Madrid candidates doing likewise shortly thereafter. All three announced their pledge to democracy and their unwillingness to participate in any further debate with Vox unless the party explicitly condemned the threats. Immediately following Iglesias's exit from the debate, the PP of incumbent president Isabel Díaz Ayuso—who was notoriously absent from the debate—commented on the incident by publishing a controversial tweet which read as "Iglesias, close the door behind you. 4 May". The tweet was deleted shortly after as a result of the media backlash it provoked, as it was seen as showing the party as supportive of Vox's stance not to condemn the death threat.

From the Cadena SER debate afterwards, the course of the campaign changed. Vox intensified its aggressive campaigning style: after a controversial ad aimed at criminalizing migrant unaccompanied minors, which received criticism for its alleged "racism", as well as Monasterio's performance in the debates being regarded as overtly disrespectful and undemocratic, Vox leader Santiago Abascal overtly questioned the veracity of the death threats and accused Iglesias of being a "crybaby and coward" as well as "fucking spoiled child of Spanish politics". PSOE, Más Madrid and Unidas Podemos regarded Vox's stance as "fascist" and unified their political positions, coordinating themselves in order to turn around the PP's campaign narrative of "communism or freedom" into a "democracy or fascism" message by highlighting the menace of an increasingly radical Vox being the government kingmaker in the aftermath of the election. Until then running a comfortable campaign propelled by favourable opinion polls, Vox's aggressivity placed Ayuso and her PP in a difficult position, as they were now required to distance themselves from the far-right party or face a possible backlash from the left-from-centre electorate.

Opinion polls
The tables below list opinion polling results in reverse chronological order, showing the most recent first and using the dates when the survey fieldwork was done, as opposed to the date of publication. Where the fieldwork dates are unknown, the date of publication is given instead. The highest percentage figure in each polling survey is displayed with its background shaded in the leading party's colour. If a tie ensues, this is applied to the figures with the highest percentages. The "Lead" column on the right shows the percentage-point difference between the parties with the highest percentages in a poll.

Graphical summary

Voting intention estimates
The table below lists weighted voting intention estimates. Refusals are generally excluded from the party vote percentages, while question wording and the treatment of "don't know" responses and those not intending to vote may vary between polling organisations. When available, seat projections determined by the polling organisations are displayed below (or in place of) the percentages in a smaller font; 69 seats were required for an absolute majority in the Assembly of Madrid (67 until January 2021).

Voting preferences
The table below lists raw, unweighted voting preferences.

Victory preferences
The table below lists opinion polling on the victory preferences for each party in the event of a regional election taking place.

Victory likelihood
The table below lists opinion polling on the perceived likelihood of victory for each party in the event of a regional election taking place.

Preferred President
The table below lists opinion polling on leader preferences to become president of the Community of Madrid.

Voter turnout
The table below shows registered vote turnout on election day without including voters from the Census of Absent-Residents (CERA).

Results

Overall

Aftermath

The election saw a voter turnout of 71.7%, the highest for a Madrilenian regional election in history, surpassing the previous record in 1995. The People's Party (PP) saw a dramatic increase in support from 30 to 65 seats, four short of an overall majority on its own and greater than a prospective alliance of all three leftist parties in the Assembly, which would have only 58 seats. The PP victory, which doubled its share of the popular vote from its worst historical result in the previous election, came at the expense of Citizens (Cs), whose support collapsed from 19.5% to 3.6%, below the five percent threshold, as well as the Spanish Socialist Workers' Party (PSOE), which scored in third place in the region for the first time in history. The PSOE ran what was seen as a lackluster campaign and suffered from the strong performance of the progressive and ecologist Más Madrid. The far-right Vox party was able to resist the PP landslide and remain a decisive force in the government formation process; however, the heavy leverage obtained by the PP from its election result was likely to cast off any prospective coalition agreement between the two parties, allowing the formation of a minority government instead. Ayuso swept all municipalities but two in the region, winning historical PSOE-strongholds like Parla, which resisted the PP's landslides in 2007 and 2011.

Following the announcement of the results, President Isabel Díaz Ayuso claimed to have won the support of Madrilenians to keep applying her policies, whereas Vox candidate Rocío Monasterio announced that her party would allow Ayuso's investiture in order to "stop the left". Podemos candidate Pablo Iglesias announced his retirement from politics after claiming to have been turned into "a scapegoat" who "mobilizes the worst of those who hate democracy". Más Madrid candidate Mónica García accepted her new role as leader of the opposition to Ayuso's government following her second place performance amid the collapse of Ángel Gabilondo's PSOE.

Notes

References
Opinion poll sources

Other

2021 in the Community of Madrid
Madrid
Regional elections in the Community of Madrid
May 2021 events in Spain